The Princeton Sound Lab is a research laboratory in the Department of Computer Science at Princeton University, in collaboration with the Department of Music.  The Sound Lab conducts research in a variety of areas in computer music, including physical modeling, audio analysis, audio synthesis, programming languages for audio and multimedia, interactive controller design, psychoacoustics, and real-time systems for composition and performance.

External links
http://soundlab.cs.princeton.edu/

Princeton University
Audio engineering